Camille Verhœven series is an oeuvre of the crime genre by French author Pierre Lemaitre. The books initially written in French have been translated to English. The first three books in the series have been nominated to the shortlist in CWA International Dagger award and two have garnered the prestigious award.

About the author
Pierre Lemaitre (born 19 April 1951 in Paris) is a Prix Goncourt-winning French author and a screenwriter. His first novel to be translated into English, Alex, is a translation of the French book of the same title, it won the CWA International Dagger for best crime novel of 2013.[1][3] In November 2013, he was awarded the Prix Goncourt, France's top literary prize, for Au revoir là-haut, an epic about World War I. His novel Camille won the CWA International Dagger in 2015.

Books
 2014 Irene ( translated from 2006 Travail soigné by Frank Wynne )
 2013 Alex (translated from 2011 Alex by Frank Wynne )
 2015 Camille  (translated from 2012 Sacrifices by Frank Wynne)

Awards
 2013 CWA International Dagger, Alex 
 2015 CWA International Dagger, Camille

References

External links 

Translation awards
Mystery and detective fiction awards